Cristian Gastón Fabbiani (born 3 September 1983 in Ciudad Evita) is an Argentine former professional footballer and current manager at Fenix de Pilar.

Playing career
Fabbiani comes from a family of footballers, he has 13 relatives from his father's side of the family who were professional footballers, including an uncle who played for Chile's national team, Óscar Fabbiani. During his period spent in Chile at Palestino, he was nicknamed El Ogro which was a reference to a goal celebration he used to make using a Shrek mask. In the 2006–07 season, Fabbiani played 6 games for Beitar Jerusalem, helping the team win the Israeli Premier League. In 2007 he was transferred by Lanús in Romania at CFR Cluj for a transfer fee estimated between 2–3 million €. In his first season at CFR, he scored 10 goals in 28 league matches and played four games, scoring one goal in the Cupa României, helping the team win the first trophies in the club's history, he also made his debut in a European club competition, playing two games in the UEFA Cup. In the next season he played only one game in which he scored one goal for CFR, being loaned to Argentine club Newell's Old Boys. In 2009, he was loaned again by CFR, this time at River Plate for a $500.000 fee. In the first round of the Clausura 2009, before a match against Colón he was presented to the fans on the El Monumental stadium together with Marcelo Gallardo, who was on his second return as a player, wearing a River shirt with the motto: Por amor a River. His transfer caused a stir among River Plate supporters, which inspired the musician Javier Montes, who was a fan of the team to compose a song for him called La Banda del Ogro.  In 2010, Fabbiani went to CD Veracruz to play in the Mexican second division, but he failed to impress in preseason training, resulting in Veracruz terminating the contract. He then joined recently promoted Argentine Primera División side All Boys. In October 2020 he announced his retirement, the last club he played for being Deportivo Merlo.

Managerial career
In June 2021, Fabbiani started his career as manager at Primera B Metropolitana club, Fenix de Pilar.

Honours
Beitar Jerusalem
Israeli Premier League: 2006–07
CFR Cluj
Liga I: 2007–08
Cupa României: 2007–08

References

External links
 
 
 
 
 

1983 births
Living people
People from La Matanza Partido
Sportspeople from Buenos Aires Province
Association football forwards
Argentine footballers
Argentine expatriate footballers
Argentine Primera División players
Liga I players
Israeli Premier League players
Bolivian Primera División players
Liga Panameña de Fútbol players
Club Atlético Lanús footballers
Club Deportivo Palestino footballers
Beitar Jerusalem F.C. players
CFR Cluj players
Newell's Old Boys footballers
Club Atlético River Plate footballers
All Boys footballers
Independiente Rivadavia footballers
Sport Boys Warnes players
Club Sportivo Estudiantes players
L.D.U. Portoviejo footballers
Deportivo Merlo footballers
Unión Deportivo Universitario players
Argentine football managers
Expatriate footballers in Chile
Expatriate footballers in Israel
Expatriate footballers in Romania
Expatriate footballers in Bolivia
Expatriate footballers in Ecuador
Expatriate footballers in Panama
Argentine expatriate sportspeople in Israel
Argentine expatriate sportspeople in Romania
Argentine expatriate sportspeople in Chile
Argentine expatriate sportspeople in Bolivia
Argentine expatriate sportspeople in Ecuador
Argentine expatriate sportspeople in Panama